Michael Byun (born January 11, 1989), better known by his stage name Mike B, is an American singer, songwriter, rapper, and producer of Korean descent. He originates from the Koreatown neighborhood of Los Angeles, California.

Early life
Born in Los Angeles, California to South Korean immigrants, Michael Byun started writing music when he was fourteen years old in a group where he began to develop skills such as music structuring. He had an emotionally hurtful event in his life, which led him to write his feelings down, creating them into lyrics, and producing his first song the same night. From then on he started writing about life-altering moments, to humorous and witty lyricism as the foundation of his music.

Career

Talented producer and close friend of Mike B., Matt Merisola (aka LoDef), produced many of Mike's music and as a team have worked together to unveil the unique album "Dear Michael, You’re Welcome". (Released nationwide, 12.12.12) The collaboration of the innovative fuse of hip-hop, electronic, and soul-jazz beats that are carefully pieced together by LoDef and the versatile yet relatable lyricism that Mike B. offers only one result to the outcome.

Mike B.'s first solo project prior to this album was his mix tape album; "Better Late Than Never." This project's focus was to express his personal emotions and the enthusiasm he had and still has for music. With the great outcomes of the first album, Mike B. was driven by success and passion to continue his dream to be an artist.

Although both albums may seem to have the same focal point, Mike B.'s newest album is definitely a story to hear through his music. This album includes a lot more of Mike B.'s song-writing forte, where he was able to incorporate them into the hooks of his tracks. There are also featured artists like, Breezy Lovejoy, Jazz & The Giant, and Toestah. "Dear Michael, You’re Welcome", contains 12 songs that tell a journey of Mike B. and his constant battle with his passion to pursue his music career but sacrifice time with the family and friends that support him through his trek.

In 2013, Mike B. was a performer and finalist in Kollaboration, a performing arts organization with an annual showcase produced by a diverse group of students and working professionals. He believed that there was not many platforms for Asian Americans in the entertainment industry as pop culture has not fully accepted them. Being an Asian American and recently becoming an independent artist, he auditioned for Kollaboration in hopes to showcase his talent and get his name and music out to the public.

Style and influences
In an interview, he mentioned that he listens to a wide array of different genres such as jazz, acoustic, R&B, electronic, and indie rather than just hip hop. As far as individuals, he said he received influence from artist such as Jay Z, Kanye West, Lupe Fiasco, Pharrell Williams, John Mayer, and Frank Ocean.

In another interview he stated that being born and raised in Los Angeles, California, he had a big west coast influence listening to artists such as Kurupt, Snoop Dogg, and Bone Thugs-n-Harmony.

Mike B., like other hip hop artists, has a lyrical flow, but also slows it down which has a big appeal to R&B fans. His style can be best described as a mix between hip hop and R&B combined with electronic beats and soul jazz.

Discography
Solo albums

Better Late Than Never (2011)
Dear Michael, You're Welcome (2013)
TWENTY04 (2014)

Guest appearances
JAZZ&THEGIANT - "Private Party" (2012)
Toestah - "Bowtie Gang" from Dangerzone (2013)
Jose Rios- "Come Again" from To Live and Grow in L.A. (2013)
Jose Rios- "Traveling / Policeman" from To Live and Grow in L.A. (2013)
JAZZ&THEGIANT - "High Standard" (2014)
Callum Connor - "WAKE UP" (2015)
Dumbfoundead - "Still Goin' (2015)
Ken Nana- "Worth It' (2015)

References

External links
 https://whosmikeb.bandcamp.com

1989 births
Living people